Archery at the 2005 Southeast Asian Games was held at Remy Field, Subic Bay Freeport Zone, Zambales, Philippines.  The archery schedule began on November 28 and ended on December 4.

There were eight gold medals contested, with individual and team events for men and the same for women.

This was the first year that the compound archery category was introduced at the SEA Games.

Ranking rounds were done using a FITA round (now known as the 1440 round). The score from that round determined the match-ups in the elimination rounds, with high-ranking archers facing low-ranking archers.

Matchplay at the SEA Games was done from a range of 70 meters.  The target's total diameter was 122 cm.  An archer had 40 seconds to fire each arrow.  Each National Olympic Committee being able to enter a maximum of three archers. Each archer fired six ends, or groups, of 12 arrows per end in the ranking round.    There were three rounds of elimination that used six ends of three arrows, narrowing the field of archers to 32, then to 16, then to 8.  The three final rounds (quarterfinals, semifinals, and medal matches) each used four ends of three arrows.

The teams consisted of the country's three archers from the individual round, and the team's initial ranking was determined by summing the three members' scores in the individual ranking round.  Each round of eliminations consisted of each team firing 27 arrows (9 by each archer).

Medal tally

Medalists

Recurve

Compound

External links
Southeast Asian Games Official Results

2005 Southeast Asian Games events
Archery at the Southeast Asian Games
2005 in archery
Archery competitions in the Philippines